Philip Stenmalm (born 3 March 1992) is a Swedish handball player who plays for Ystads IF and the Swedish national team.

At the 2013 Men's Junior World Handball Championship he was chosen as MVP. He competed at the 2016 European Men's Handball Championship.

He is the older brother of fellow handball player Elliot Stenmalm.

References

External links

1992 births
Living people
People from Växjö
Swedish male handball players
Handball players at the 2016 Summer Olympics
Olympic handball players of Sweden
Expatriate handball players in Poland
Swedish expatriate sportspeople in Spain
Swedish expatriate sportspeople in Denmark
Swedish expatriate sportspeople in Poland
Liga ASOBAL players
KIF Kolding players
HK Drott players
Wisła Płock (handball) players
Sportspeople from Kronoberg County
21st-century Swedish people